The Ticinese franco (plural: franchi) was the currency of the Swiss canton of Ticino between 1813 and 1850. It was subdivided into 20 soldi (singular: soldo), each of 12 denari (singular denaro), similar to the British pounds, shillings and pence system. It was worth th the French silver écu or 6.67 g fine silver.

The frank was the currency of the Helvetian Republic from its establishment in 1798, but ceased issuing coins in 1803. Ticino introduced the franco, equivalent to the frank, in 1813 and issued coins until 1845. In 1850, the Swiss franc was introduced across the whole country, to the value of 1 Ticino franco = 1.4597 Swiss francs.

References

External links

Modern obsolete currencies
Currencies of Switzerland
1813 establishments in Switzerland
1850 disestablishments in Europe
19th century in Switzerland
19th-century economic history